Armando Lucero (1942 – May 5, 2010) was an Argentine man arrested in 2009 on charges of raping one of his daughters over a period of 20 years. He was alleged to have fathered seven children with her, and also to have raped two of his other daughters. He was arrested when his daughter went to the police after fears he would abuse her own children.

Lucero died in prison of respiratory infection in early May 2010 while awaiting trial.

The case is similar to that of the 2016 Domingo Bulacio case which also took place in Argentina.

See also
List of child abuse cases featuring long-term detention
Kidnapping of Jaycee Lee Dugard
Lydia Gouardo
Mongelli case
Natascha Kampusch
Sheffield incest case
Fritzl case
Alvarez case
Moe incest case

References 

1942 births
2010 deaths
People charged with rape
Respiratory disease deaths in Argentina
Infectious disease deaths in Argentina
Deaths from respiratory tract infection
Incest
Place of birth missing
Argentine people who died in prison custody
Prisoners who died in Argentine detention
Incidents of violence against girls